Kweku Eyiah, is a Ghanaian lawyer and football administrator. He is a product of Mfantsipim School and Ghana School of Law. He served as board member of Cape Coast Ebusua Dwarfs. He was one of three football administrators to have rejected bribes in the Number 12 exposé. The others were John Frederick Mensah and Chief Protocol Officer at the Ministry of Youth and Sports, Diana Boateng.

References 

21st-century Ghanaian lawyers
Ghana School of Law alumni
Mfantsipim School alumni